Jazzenzo is a Dutch jazz e-zine that focuses on Dutch musicians, but also covers international artists. The word "enzo" in the name is a Dutch expression and means "and such". The owner of the magazine is Erno Elsinga.

Jazzenzo contains articles, interviews, concert reviews, concert schedules, CD-reviews, opinion, comical anecdotes, travel reports of musicians and jazz-themed news.

References

External links
Official Website

Music magazines published in the Netherlands
Jazz magazines
Online music magazines published in the Netherlands
Magazines with year of establishment missing
Dutch-language magazines
Dutch music websites